Mandra  (Urdu: مندره) is a town of Tehsil Gujar Khan, District Rawalpindi,  Punjab, Pakistan. It is also known as the city of Rajput and Mirzas with castes like Jasgam, Janjua and Bhatti. Mandra itself is also the chief town of Union Council Mandra which is an administrative subdivision of the Tehsil.
 It is located at 33°21'059.89" North, 73° 14' 22.69" East.

History

Mandra was founded by descendants of General Zarab Khan. There were three  brothers looking for a fertile land to settle traveling from the mountains of Kahuta and then they settled there which was the beginning of the reign of Jasgam (Jaskham) in the area of Tehsil Gujarkhan.The family has contributed a lot for the locals, including opening the first government hospital and being active in community service. After independence in 1947 they gave lands to Muhajarins to settle. As per tribe's history and norms, Jasgams use the title of Raja. They helped other homeless people to settle and give them shelter. Today among Mandra's most prominent people are the Jasgam Khatril Rajputs as they own most of the land and markets in the Main Baazaar and are very active in politics.

Railways

Mandra Railway Station is on the main Peshawar to Karachi railway line. Mandra is also the railway junction from where the train goes to Chakwal, though currently the Mandra-Chakwal Line is non-operational.

Post office

There is a post office in Mandra providing postal services to the locality.

Notes: In Order to keep the Infobox brief, kindly only use the current or most recent titles.

References

Populated places in Gujar Khan Tehsil
Union councils of Gujar Khan Tehsil
Gujar Khan
Gujar Khan Tehsil